Katrín Júlíusdóttir (born 23 November 1974), is a former Icelandic politician. In 2016 she left Politics and has since then been the Managing Director of Finance Iceland. In 2020 she received the Svartfuglinn-Award for her first Crime Novel, Sykur (en: Sugar), published by Veröld in October 2020. Katrín is married to the Icelandic author Bjarni M. Bjarnason and they have four sons.

References

External links 
 Katrín Júlíusdóttir's curriculum vitae on the parliament website

1974 births
Living people
Finance ministers of Iceland
Katrin Juliusdottir
Katrin Juliusdottir
Female finance ministers